Athenais was a Roman noblewoman of Greek Athenian and Italian Roman descent. Athenais lived between the second half of the 2nd century and first half of the 3rd century in the Roman Empire.

Athenais was the daughter of the Athenian Aristocrat Lucius Vibullius Hipparchus and his unnamed wife. Her paternal half uncle was Lucius Vibullius Claudius Herodes. Her paternal grandparents was the Aristocrat Lucius Vibullius Rufus and noblewoman Athenais. Athenais was named in honor of her late paternal grandmother. Her paternal grandparents were paternal second cousins. Through her paternal grandmother, Athenais was a great granddaughter of the Sophist Herodes Atticus and Roman aristocratic noblewoman Aspasia Annia Regilla and through her paternal grandfather she was a great granddaughter of Publius Aelius Vibullius Rufus who served as an Archon of Athens in 143–144. Herodes Atticus and Publius Aelius Vibullius Rufus were first cousins. Through Aspasia Annia Regilla, Athenais was a relative to the family of the Roman Emperor Marcus Aurelius and Roman Empress Faustina the Younger.

Athenais was born and raised in Athens. She is only known from honorific inscriptions dedicated to her in Greece. There was a statue dedicated to her at Olympia, Greece and the headless statue of her is on display at the Archaeological Museum of Olympia.

Ancestry

References

Sources
 Σ. Θ. Φωτείνου, Ολυμπία - Οδηγός Αρχαιοτήτων, Συγκρότημα Γραφικών Τεχνών, Άνω Καλαμάκι Αθήνα, 1972
 Graindor, P., Un milliardaire antique, Ayers Company Publishers, 1979
 Pomeroy, S.B., The murder of Regilla: a case of domestic violence in antiquity, Harvard University Press, 2007
 https://web.archive.org/web/20110716083759/http://www.sleepinbuff.com/13history.pdf
 http://www.vroma.org/~bmcmanus/women_civicdonors.html

3rd-century Roman women
2nd-century Romans
2nd-century Greek women